In most cases, when a professional athlete announces retirement, he or she retires and then never returns to playing professional sports; however, in rare instances there are some athletes who came out of retirement. The following list shows such athletes in addition to any noteworthy achievements that they earned during their playing career after returning from retirement. It includes only professional athletes who announced retirement, were retired for at least one full season or year, and then returned to play their sport in at least one regular season contest. The list does not include players who sat out at least one full season due to injury and then returned to play without having ever officially announced retirement, nor does it include players whose careers were interrupted because of military service or incarceration. It also excludes free agents who were unable to find a team for at least a season and signed with a team at a later point without having ever officially announced retirement.

American football 

 Maxie Baughan (1960–1970, 1974)
 Ross Brupbacher (1970-72, 1976)
 Randall Cunningham (1985–1995, 1997–2001)
 Anthony Davis (2010–14, 2016)
 Steve DeBerg (1977–1993, 1998)
 Kyle Emanuel (2015–18, 2020)
 Carl Etelman (1924–27, 1929)
 Rob Gronkowski (2010–2018, 2020–2021)
 Charles Haley (1986–96, 1998–99)
Bill Hewitt (1932–39, 1943)
 Ed "Too Tall" Jones (1974–78, 1980–89)
 Marshawn Lynch (2007–2015, 2017–19)
 Rueben Mayes (1986–90, 1992–93)
 Rolando McClain (2010–12, 2014–15)
 Randy Moss (1998–2010, 2012)
 Bronko Nagurski (1930–37, 1943)
 Red Pearlman (1919–1922, 1924)
 Jim Ramey (1979–1985, 1987)
 Manny Rapp (1934, 1937, 1942)
 John Riggins (1971–79, 1981–85)
 Deion Sanders (1989–2000, 2004–05)
 John Tosi (1939–1942, 1944, 1946)
 Eric Weddle (2007–2019, 2021)
 Reggie White (1984–1998, 2000)
 Ricky Williams (1999–2003, 2005–2011)
 Jason Witten (2003–2017, 2019–2020)

Association football 
 Zico (1971–1989, 1991–1994)
 Alan Judge (1978–1997, 2002–2004)
 Aldair (1986–2005, 2007–2008)
 Marc Overmars (1990–2004, 2008–2009)
 Roberto Carlos (1991–2012, 2015)
 Dida (1992–2010, 2012–2015)
 Paul Scholes (1993–2011, 2012–2013)
 Landon Donovan (1999–2014, 2016, 2018–2019)
 Arjen Robben (2000–2019, 2020–2021)
 Dani Osvaldo (2005–2016, 2020)

Australian rules football 
Gary Ablett Sr. (1982, 1984–1990, 1991–1996)
Tony Lockett (1983–1999, 2002)
Tim Watson (1977–1991, 1993–1994)
Paul Salmon (1983–2000, 2002)
Peter Hudson (1967–1974, 1977)
Stuart Dew (1997–2006, 2008–2009)
James McDonald (1997–2010, 2012)
Shane Heard (1977–1987, 1991)
Nathan Ablett (2005–2007, 2011)
Peter McKenna (1965–1975, 1977)
Shane Mumford (2008–2017, 2019–2021)
Dermott Brereton (1982–1992, 1994–1995)
Scott Hodges (1991–1993, 1996)
Martin Clarke (2007–2009, 2012–2014)

Baseball 

 Ed Abbaticchio (1897–1905, 1907–1910)
 Daniel Bard (2009–2013, 2020–present)
 Chief Bender (1903–1917, 1925)
 Yogi Berra (1946–1963, 1965)
 Joe Blanton (2004–2013, 2015–2017)
 Jim Bouton (1962–1970, 1978)
 Blaine Boyer (2005–11, 2014–18)
 Chris Chambliss (1971–1986, 1988)
 Ben Chapman (1930–1941, 1944–1946)
 David Cone (1986–2001, 2003)
 Tony Conigliaro (1964–1971, 1975)
 Dizzy Dean (1930–1941, 1947)
 Mike Donlin (1899–1906, 1908, 1911–1912, 1914)
 Jim Eisenreich (1982–1984, 1987–1998)
 Kevin Elster (1986–1998, 2000)
 Jackie Jensen (1950–1959, 1961)
 Jimmie Foxx (1925–1942, 1944–1945)
 Jerry Grote (1963–1978, 1981)
 Babe Herman (1926–1937, 1945)
 Gabe Kapler (1998–2006, 2008–2010)
 Marc Kroon (1995, 1997–1998, 2004)
 Minnie Miñoso (1949–1964, 1976, 1980)
 Charley O'Leary, (1904–1913, 1934)
 Jim O'Rourke (1872–1893, 1904)
 Joe Page (1944–1950, 1954)
 Satchel Paige (1926–1953, 1965)
 Troy Percival (1995–2005, 2007–2009)
 Andy Pettitte (1995–2010, 2012–2013)
 Ryne Sandberg (1981–1994, 1996–1997)
 Paul Shuey (1994–2003, 2007)
 J. T. Snow (1992–2006, 2008)
 Dave Stieb (1979–1993, 1998)
 George Strickland (1950–1957, 1959–1960)
 Salomón Torres (1993–1997, 2002–2008)
 Hal Trosky (1933–1941, 1943, 1946)
 Lloyd Waner (1927–1942, 1944)

Basketball 
 Jonathan Bender (1999–2006, 2009–2010)
 Bob Cousy (1950–1963, 1969–1970)
 Dave Cowens (1970–1980, 1982–83)
 Carlos Delfino (1998–2013, 2017–present)
 Richie Guerin (1956–1967, 1968–1970)
 Danny Ildefonso (1998–2015, 2023–present)
 Kevin Johnson (1987–1998, 1999–2000)
 Magic Johnson (1979–1991, 1996)
 Michael Jordan (1984–1993, 1995–1998, 2001–2003)
 George Mikan (1946–1954, 1956)
 Sidney Moncrief (1979–1989, 1990–91)
 John Salley (1986–1996, 1999–2000)
 Robert Reid (1977–1982, 1983–1991)
 Brandon Roy (2006–2011, 2012–13)
 Saulius Štombergas (1992–2007, 2009–2010)
 Rasheed Wallace (1995–2010, 2012–2013)
 Kelly Williams (2006–2019, 2021–present)
 Kevin Willis (1984–2005, 2006–07)

Boxing 
Joe Louis (1934-48, 1950-51)
Muhammad Ali (1960–1979, 1980–1981)
Sugar Ray Leonard (1977–1982, 1983–1984, 1986–1987, 1988–1991, 1996–1997)
George Foreman (1969–1977, 1987–1997)

Cricket 
 Imran Khan (1971–1987, 1988–1992)
 Ray Illingworth
 Shahid Afridi
 Russell Sands

Cycling 
 Lance Armstrong (1992–2005, 2009–2011)

Ice hockey 

 Helmuts Balderis (1973–1985, 1989–1990, 1991–1996)
 Barry Beck (1977–1986, 1989–1990)
 Carl Brewer (1957–1965, 1967–1974, 1979–1980)
 Alexandre Daigle (1993–2000, 2002–2010)
 Ron Ellis (1964–1975, 1977–1981)
 Dominik Hasek (1980–2002, 2003–2008, 2009–2011)
 Gordie Howe  (1946–1971, 1973–1980, 1997)
 Guy Lafleur (1971–1985, 1988–1991)
 Claude Lemieux (1983–2004, 2008–2009)
 Mario Lemieux (1984–1997, 2000–2006)
 Ted Lindsay (1944–1960, 1964–1965)
 Dickie Moore (1951–1963, 1964–1965, 1967–1968)
 Mark Pavelich (1980–1989, 1991)
 Jim Peplinski (1980–1989, 1995)
 Jacques Plante (1952–1965, 1968–1975)
 Gary Roberts (1985–1996, 1997–2009)
 Al Secord (1978–1990, 1994–1996)
 Steve Smith (1983–1997, 1998–2000)

Mixed martial arts 
 Tito Ortiz (1997–2012, 2014–present)
 Randy Couture (1997–2006, 2007–2011)
 Chuck Liddell (1998–2010, 2018)
 Fedor Emelianenko (2000–2012, 2015–present)
 Georges St-Pierre (2002–2013, 2017)
 Urijah Faber (2003–2016, 2019)
 Brock Lesnar (2007–2011, 2016)
 Alexander Gustafsson (2006–2019, 2020–present)

Motorsports 
 Fernando Alonso (2001-2018, 2021-present)
 Neil Bonnett (1974–1990, 1993)
 Alan Jones (1975–1981, 1983, 1985–1986)
 Matt Kenseth (2000–2018, 2020)
 Niki Lauda (1971–1979, 1982–1985)
 Fred Lorenzen (1956, 1960–1967, 1970–1972)
 Felipe Massa (2002-2016, 2017)
 Michael Schumacher (1991–2006, 2010–2012)
 Ryan Dungey (2006–2017, 2022–present)

Rugby union 
 Andy Goode (1998–2015, 2015–2016, 2020)
 Peter Rogers (1990–2004, 2007–2008)

Skateboarding
 Tony Hawk (1982–2003, 2021)

Swimming 
 Brent Hayden (2002–12, 2019–present)
 Michael Phelps (2000–12, 2014–16)
 Dara Torres (1984–92, 2000, 2007–12)

Tennis 
 Björn Borg (1973–1983, 1991–1993)
 Martina Hingis (1994–2002, 2006–2007, 2013–2017)
 Kim Clijsters (1997–2007, 2009–2012, 2020–2022)
 Justine Henin (1999–2008, 2010–2011)

Notes

References

Retirement